Hugh Murray Buntine (18 March 1895 – 2 April 1971) was a rugby union player who represented Australia.

Buntine, a centre, was born in Port Macquarie, New South Wales and claimed 1 international rugby cap for Australia.

References

Australian rugby union players
Australia international rugby union players
1895 births
1971 deaths
People educated at Scots College (Sydney)
Rugby union players from New South Wales
Rugby union centres